Bego can refer to:
 
 Mont Bégo, a mountain in the Mercantour massif of the Maritime Alps, in southern France
 Vojislav Bego (1923–1999), Croatian electrical engineer